Colaspinella is a genus of leaf beetles in the subfamily Eumolpinae. It contains only one species, Colaspinella grandis. It is endemic to Turkey.

References

Eumolpinae
Monotypic Chrysomelidae genera
Beetles of Europe
Insects of Turkey
Taxa named by Julius Weise